The 2019 Paul Ricard FIA Formula 3 round was a motor racing event held on 22 and 23 June 2019 at the Circuit Paul Ricard in France. It is the second round of the 2019 FIA Formula 3 Championship, and ran in support of the 2019 French Grand Prix.

Summary

Background
Following the opening round, Russian driver Robert Shwartzman leads the championship by thirteen points over Christian Lundgaard of Denmark, with Shwartzman's team-mate Jehan Daruvala a further three points behind the Dane.

Artem Petrov will be absent from the round, and with his Jenzer Motorsport team unable to draft in a replacement due to visa restrictions the grid would stand at 29 cars.

Qualifying
Jake Hughes of HWA Racelab would claim the pole position, beating Daruvala by just under 9-hundredths of a second. Championship leader Shwartzman will start third alongside Pedro Piquet, son of former world champion Nelson Piquet.

Classification

Qualifying

Feature Race

Notes:
 Yuki Tsunoda, David Beckmann and Christian Lundgaard were awarded a five-second penalty for track limits abuse.

Sprint Race

Standings after the event

Drivers' Championship standings

Teams' Championship standings

 Note: Only the top five positions are included for both sets of standings.

See also
2019 Paul Ricard FIA Formula 2 round

References

External links
Official website

|- style="text-align:center"
|width="35%"|Previous race:
|width="30%"|FIA Formula 3 Championship2019 season
|width="40%"|Next race:

Le Castellet
Le Castellet
Le Castellet